Alphonzo Bailey (born November 5, 1975), better known by his stage name Al Kapone, is an American rapper from Memphis, Tennessee. Al Kapone is known principally for his underground success in the Memphis hip hop scene in the 1990s, and his later role in a number of more contemporary songs.

Career
After a decade of cultivating underground cult status in Memphis, Al Kapone began to achieve some mainstream success starting with his role on the soundtrack to the film, Hustle & Flow. The soundtrack included one solo track, titled "Get Crunk, Get Buck".  He also wrote and produced "Whoop That Trick" and wrote "Hustle & Flow (It Ain't Over)", both tracks performed by Djay. His song "The Deepest Hood" featured in the 2007 film, Stomp the Yard.

Al Kapone co-wrote E-40's "U and Dat" and Lil' Jon's "Snap Yo Fingers" and appeared on fellow Memphis hip hoppers Three 6 Mafia's album, Last 2 Walk, and 8Ball & MJG's, Ridin High.

Discography

Albums
1992: Street Knowledge: Chapters 1-12
1994: Pure Ghetto Anger
1994: Sinista Funk
1995: Da Resurrection
1997: What Cha Got
1998: Memphis to the Bombed out Bay
2002: Goin' All Out
2008: Poppin' Tags (EP)
2008: Al Kapeezy Oh Boy - The Hits!!
2008: Showdown: Reloaded (with Mr. Sche)
2010: Godfather EP
2010: Guitar Bump
2010: The Kapeezy Soul Hop Experience

Single
1992: "Lyrical Drive-By (Indie single)"
1997: "What Cha Got Remix"
2013: "Memphis Pride"
2013: "Twerk Queen"

Compilations
1995: Memphiz Undaground Hustlaz Vol. 1
2001: Alakatraz Ridaz: The Present & the Past (with Taylor Boyz & Sir Vince)
2001: Alkatraz Ridaz Chapter 2 (with Taylor Boyz)
2001: Memphis Drama Vol. 1
2002: Memphis Drama Vol. 2
2002: The Best of Memphis Drama Vol. 1 & 2 Chopped & Screwed
2003: Memphis Drama Vol. 3: Outta Town Luv
2005: Memphis Drama Vol. 4: Crunk Roots
2003: Memphis Untouchables (with The Jerk & Kingpin Skinny Pimp)
2005: Showdown (with Mr. Sche)
2005: Whoop That Trick

References

External links
 Official website

African-American crunk musicians
African-American male rappers
Gangsta rappers
Horrorcore artists
Living people
Priority Records artists
Rappers from Memphis, Tennessee
Southern hip hop musicians
21st-century American rappers
1973 births
21st-century American male musicians
21st-century African-American musicians
20th-century African-American people